Megan Nick (born 9 July 1996) is an American freestyle skier specializing in aerials. She competed at the 2022 Winter Olympics in Beijing, where she won the bronze medal in aerials.

Nick went through the qualification, and in Final 1, where only six athletes qualify for Final 2, she was fifth. In Final 2, her routine was easier than that of the other athletes; in particular, she was the only athlete who did not perform a triple backflip, but she did not make mistakes, whereas many of her competitors did. NBC sports called her a "surprising medalist".

Personal life
Nick attended high school at Champlain Valley Union High School. She grew up competing in gymnastics before transitioning into aerials after attending the U.S. team’s aerial skiing Talent ID camp in Lake Placid during her final year of high school.

References

External links

1996 births
Living people
People from Shelburne, Vermont
American female freestyle skiers
Freestyle skiers at the 2022 Winter Olympics
Medalists at the 2022 Winter Olympics
Sportspeople from Vermont
Olympic bronze medalists for the United States in freestyle skiing